Rhododendron aberconwayi (碟花杜鹃) is a species of flowering plant in the heath family Ericaceae, native to north-central Yunnan, China, where it grows at altitudes of . The flowers are predominantly white or pale pink, spotted purple. 

This is a hardy plant requiring full sun and ericaceous (acid pH) soil.

References

External links
 "Rhododendron aberconwayi", Cowan, Roy. Hort. Soc. Rhododendron Year Book. 1948: 42. 1948.
 Hirsutum.com
 Danish Soc. of ARS

aberconwayi